Claus Bendeke (3 December 1763  – 29 May 1828) was a Norwegian jurist and government official. He served as a representative at the Norwegian Constitutional Assembly.

Claus Bendeke was born at Vang in Hamar in Hedmark, Norway. He was the son of Magistrate and Chancellor Andreas Bendeke (1712-1780).  In 1783, he became a student at Elsinore school in Helsingør and in 1788 he studied law. In 1795, he became merchant and whaling inspector in Greenland  from a service location in Nuuk. He served as District Governor in Hedmark from 1804 to 1816. In September 1816, he was appointed Assessor in Christiania (now Oslo) Court and was Counselor from 1823. Bendek was married to Magdalene Cathrine Pihl (1787-1843), daughter of Abraham Pihl. The couple made their home at Kjonerud, a farm in Stange where they raised their family.

He represented Hedemarken amt (now Hedmark) at the Norwegian Constituent Assembly at Eidsvoll in 1814.  At the Assembly, he supported the position of the independence party (Selvstendighetspartiet).

References

External links
Representantene på Eidsvoll 1814 (Cappelen Damm AS)
 Men of Eidsvoll (eidsvollsmenn)

Related Reading
Holme Jørn (2014) De kom fra alle kanter - Eidsvollsmennene og deres hus  (Oslo: Cappelen Damm) 

1763 births
1828 deaths
People from Hamar
Fathers of the Constitution of Norway
Inspectors of Greenland